Hanefi Mahçiçek was a Turkish politician and football chairman. He was born in Kahramanmaraş. He was the chairman of Kahramanmaraşspor.

References

Mahicicek
Living people
Members of the 22nd Parliament of Turkey
People from Kahramanmaraş
Kahramanmaraşspor